Dubov is a surname. Notable people include:

Daniil Dubov (born 1996), Russian chess grandmaster
Igor Dubov (1947–2002), Russian archaeologist
Paul Dubov (1918–1979), American actor and screenwriter
Sergei Dubov (1943–1994), Russian journalist, publisher and entrepreneur
Vladimir Dubov (born 1988), Bulgarian freestyle wrestler

Surnames
Russian-language surnames